Zenophleps is a genus of moths in the family Geometridae first described by George Duryea Hulst in 1896.

Species
Zenophleps alpinata Cassino, 1927
Zenophleps lignicolorata (Packard, 1874)
Zenophleps obscurata Hulst, 1896
Zenophleps pallescens McDunnough, 1938

References

Xanthorhoini